Malcolm David Ross (October 15, 1919 – October 8, 1985) was a captain in the United States Naval Reserve (USNR), an atmospheric scientist, and a balloonist who set several records for altitude and scientific inquiry, with more than 100 hours flight time in gas balloons by 1961. Along with Lieutenant Commander Victor A. Prather (USN), he set the altitude record for a manned balloon flight.

Life
Malcolm Ross was born on October 15, 1919 in Momence, Illinois, the son of Mr. and Mrs. J. R. Ross of 1825 Garden Street, West Lafayette, Indiana. He spent most of his early life in West Lafayette. About 1932, his family moved to a farm in Linden, Montgomery Country, Indiana. He attended all four years in Linden High School and graduated in 1936. Malcolm Ross received a scholarship to attend Purdue University to study civil engineering. While at Purdue, he worked at the campus radio station as a sports announcer and changed his major to creative writing, communication, and radio. However, Malcolm Ross graduated from Purdue in June 1941 with a BS in physics. After college, he married his high school sweetheart, Marjorie Martin, and took broadcasting jobs in Anderson, Chicago, and Indianapolis.

In January 1943, Ross was commissioned as an ensign in the United States Naval Reserve. After he completed two months training at the Quonset Point Naval Air Station in Rhode Island, the Navy sent him to graduate school for nine months training in physics and general meteorology at the University of Chicago. In June 1944, he completed the training with a professional certificate in meteorology and atmospheric science.

The Navy initially assigned Ross to the Fleet Weather Center at Pearl Harbor. Later he served as the aerology officer aboard the USS Saratoga while it was flying missions against Tokyo and Iwo Jima in the Pacific Ocean theater of World War II, from 1944 to 1945. Ross received a campaign star in his Pacific Theater Ribbon for the first carrier plane strike at Tokyo in February 1945 and for the Iwo Jima invasion.

After World War II ended, Ross was released from the military. He returned to civilian life and opened an advertising agency in Pasadena, California, where his wife, Marjorie, had moved during World War II. Marjorie worked in the agency as the office manager. The business continued successfully until June 1950, when Ross was recalled to active duty for the Korean War as a lieutenant in the United States Naval Reserve. Initially, Malcolm Ross was stationed as an instructor in radiological defense for the Naval Damage Control Training Center at Treasure Island, in San Francisco. From there he was able to commute home during weekends to spend time with his family and maintain the advertising business. This came to an end when in 1951 the Navy reassigned Ross to work as the liaison officer for the Office of Naval Research in Minneapolis.

The Navy's unmanned balloon program, Project Skyhook, was based in Minneapolis, which was also a center of balloon research and development being carried out by the University of Minnesota and General Mills. In 1953, Ross was transferred to the air branch of the Office of Naval Research (ONR) in Washington, D.C. as Balloon Projects Director. In this position, he began to direct high-altitude balloon projects to obtain cosmic ray and meteorological data with the Project Skyhook program, working with Ruby Ward as the contracts negotiator of the ONR. Ross was technical director for Project Churchy, an expedition to the Galápagos Islands to obtain cosmic ray and meteorological data from balloon flights. He arranged for balloon launchings at Goodfellow Air Force Base in 1954 and 1955. He was a member of the scientific group that launched balloons for the ONR at Saskatoon, Saskatchewan, Canada, and photographed the 1954 eclipse of the sun from a Skyhook balloon over Minneapolis.

During his tour as ONR's Balloon Projects Officer, Ross initiated the Navy's manned balloon program, Project Strato-Lab, in 1954. The Strato-Lab program utilized the new plastic high-altitude balloons for upper atmosphere research. At this time, Ross became the first active duty military officer qualified and licensed as a free balloon pilot based solely on plastic balloon experience. Ross went on inactive duty in 1955 as a Lieutenant Commander (USNR). As a physicist in the Air Branch of the ONR, Ross specialized in the physics of the upper atmosphere and participated in Strato-Lab flights both as a civilian and as a naval officer. As the key participant in Project Strato-Lab, he spent more than 100 hours with scientists and other balloonists making observations in the stratosphere. At the time of the record-setting flight in 1961, Malcolm Ross was a Commander in the Naval Reserve.

In 1957, Ross received the Navy League's newly established Rear Admiral William S. Parsons Award for Scientific and Technical Progress, and the Navy Meritorious Civilian Service Award. In 1958, jointly with Lieutenant Commander Morton Lee Lewis, he received the Harmon International Trophy (Aeronaut) for the November 8, 1956, record-breaking flight. Ross never flew in balloons again after the 1961 flight, although he continued to advocate using balloons as relatively inexpensive platforms for scientific investigations.

Ross retired from the US Naval Reserve as a captain on July 1, 1973. After leaving the Office of Naval Research, Malcolm Ross worked in space research at General Motors. Later on he became a stock brokerage executive for Merrill Lynch Pierce Fenner and Smith, Inc. and served as assistant vice president and account executive at the Bloomfield Hills branch.

Ross died at home in Birmingham, Michigan, and is buried at Arlington National Cemetery.

Balloon flights
The following table describes Malcolm Ross's balloon flights.

Awards and accolades
 In 1956 along with Morton L. Lewis awarded the Harmon Trophy for Aeronauts.
 In 1957 awarded the first Rear Admiral William S. Parsons Award for Scientific and Technical Progress presented by the Navy League of the United States.
 In 1957 awarded the Navy Meritorious Civilian Service Award.
 In 1958 awarded the Distinguished Flying Cross, "...for extraordinary achievement while participating in aerial flight as Command Pilot of a two-man Navy balloon and gondola during a daring and hazardous ascent into the upper stratosphere on 26–27 July 1958."
In 1960 received a Special Award from the American Meteorological Society along with Charles B. Moore and, posthumously, Lee Lewis, "for their recent and significant work in making important aerophysical observations from high-altitude balloons."
In 1961 awarded the Gold Star in lieu of a 2nd Distinguished Flying Cross, "...for heroism and extraordinary achievement while participating in a balloon flight on 4 May 1961."
In 1961, awarded the Harmon Trophy for Aeronauts with Lt. Cdr. Victor E. Prather (posthumously), presented by President John F. Kennedy at the White House.

See also
Charles B. Moore
Felix Baumgartner
Flight altitude record
Manned balloon altitude records
Project Manhigh
Project Skyhook
Project Strato-Lab
Victor A. Prather
Winzen Research

Notes

References

Bibliography

Malcolm Ross Papers
Malcolm D. Ross Papers including photographs, notes, correspondence, and medical records, are archived at the Smithsonian Institution, NASM Archives Accession No. 1998-0048. National Air and Space Museum. Archives Division MRC 322, Washington, D.C., 20560

External links
Balloon Ancestors of Space Flight (from Touching Space: The Story of Project Manhigh)
The Fourteen Mile Drop Monday, November 19, 1956; TIME.com article about the rapid descent that ended the 8 November 1956 record breaking flight.
John F. Kennedy: Remarks on Presenting the Harmon Trophies Thursday, October 18, 1962 (The American Presidency Project)
Shivering Look at Venus Monday, December 14, 1959; TIME.com article about the 28 November 1959 flight to observe Venus
Stratolab, an Evolutionary Stratospheric Balloon Project article by Gregory Kennedy
STRATOLAB V Exhibit (Gondola) on display at the National Naval Aviation Museum, Naval Air Station Pensacola, Florida
STRATOLAB V White Eagle Aerospace

Records

1919 births
1985 deaths
American aviation record holders
American balloonists
Balloon flight record holders
Burials at Arlington National Cemetery
Flight altitude record holders
Harmon Trophy winners
People from Momence, Illinois
People from West Lafayette, Indiana
Purdue University alumni
Recipients of the Distinguished Flying Cross (United States)
United States Navy officers
United States Navy personnel of World War II
University of Chicago alumni
Military personnel from Illinois